Putkaqucha (Quechua putka muddy (Jauja Quechua), qucha lake, lagoon, "muddy lake", Hispanicized spelling Putcacocha) is a lake in Peru located in the Junín Region, Yauli Province, Suitucancha District. It lies in the Paryaqaqa or Waruchiri mountain range, south of the mountain Putka.

There is a smaller lake of the same name nearby west of Putkaqucha.

References

Lakes of Peru
Lakes of Junín Region